Liara Roux is an American author, sex worker, indie porn director and sex worker human rights activist with a strong following online.

Roux is a high-end escort and she is fighting structural discrimination against sex workers. In her view, sex workers can be described as a marginalized group, who were endangered by SESTA and received no benefits from it. Furthermore, she was prominently against Tumblr's decision to ban porn from their platform.
She has written for Vice Media and HuffPost. Her first book, Whore of New York: A Confession, was published in October 2021.

Personal life 
Roux is both queer and genderqueer and uses she/her/he/him/they/them pronouns. She was diagnosed with autism early in life.

References

External links 
Platforms which discriminate against sex workers: #survivorsagainstsesta, document by Liara Roux et al.
Liara Roux' 
Liara Roux at HuffPost
Liara Roux at Vice

American prostitutes
20th-century births
American activists
Living people
Sex worker activists in the United States
HuffPost writers and columnists
Vice Media
Year of birth missing (living people)
People with non-binary gender identities
Queer writers
Non-binary writers
People on the autism spectrum